Andrei Pavlovich Dmitriyev (born 6 August 1965) is a Russian football coach. He is an assistant coach with FC Akhmat Grozny.

References

External links
 Profile by Russian Premier League

1965 births
Sportspeople from Omsk
Living people
Russian football managers